The 2009–10 Libyan League Cup is the 3rd edition of the competition since its inception in 2007. This year's edition sees the 14 teams competing in the 2009–10 Libyan Premier League split up into four groups depending on geographical location; seven teams from the West and the other seven from the East. The top team from each group advanced to a two-legged semi-final, before a two-legged final to decide the winners. The competition is aimed at giving younger players and fringe first team players game time.

Group matches were played in March, with the semi-finals and final taking place in late May and early June.

Groups

Group A

Group B

Group C

Group D

Semi-finals

First leg

Second leg 

Madina won 4–2 on aggregate

Hilal won 3–1 on aggregate

Final

First leg

Second leg 

Madina won 4–0 on aggregate

League Cup
Libyan League Cup